FrontBase is a relational database management system written in ANSI C.  FrontBase uses the Unicode character encoding.

International standards
FrontBase complies with SQL 92 (fully compliant), Unicode (Unicode 2.0) and TCP/IP (uses sockets).

Available platforms
FrontBase is available on the following platforms:
 Macintosh - Mac OS X, Mac OS X Server 10.x and Mac OS X Server 1.2
 Linux - RedHat, SuSE(Intel and Power PC), YellowDog Linux and Mandrake Linux
 Unix - FreeBSB, Solaris and HP-UX
 Windows - Windows NT and Windows 2000.

Drivers and adaptors

Drivers and adaptors include Apple WebObjects, PHP3, PHP4, Perl, ODBC, JDBC, Omnis Studio, REALBasic, Tcl, EOF, FBAccess and FBCAccess.

Data types
Data types supported include INTEGER, DECIMAL, TIMESTAMP, BLOB and VARCHAR.

See also
List of relational database management systems
Comparison of relational database management systems

References

External links

Java platform software
SQL
Relational database management systems
Relational database management software for Linux